The 2010 Greek Cup Final was the 66th final of the Greek Cup. The match took place on 24 April 2010 at Olympic Stadium. The contesting teams were Panathinaikos and Aris. It was Panathinaikos' twenty seventh Greek Cup Final in their 102-year history and Aris' ninth Greek Cup Final in their 96 years of existence. Aris achieved a record of most mass movement of fans in Greece. About 25,000 Aris' fans followed their team to the Olympic Stadium forming a queue of many kilometers on the Thessaloniki-Athens highway from a number of buses, as well as cars. It was characteristic that the last vehicle of the procession arrived at the stadium three hours after the arrival of the first.

Venue

This was the seventeenth Greek Cup Final held at the Athens Olympic Stadium, after the 1983, 1984, 1985, 1986, 1987, 1988, 1989, 1990, 1993, 1994, 1995, 1996, 1999, 2000, 2002 and 2009 finals.

The Athens Olympic Stadium was built in 1982 and renovated once in 2004. The stadium is used as a venue for AEK Athens and Panathinaikos and was used for Olympiacos and Greece in various occasions. Its current capacity is 69,618 and hosted 3 UEFA European Cup/Champions League Finals in 1983, 1994 and 2007, a UEFA Cup Winners' Cup Final in 1987, the 1991 Mediterranean Games and the 2004 Summer Olympics.

Background
Panathinaikos had reached the Greek Cup Final twenty six times, winning sixteen of them. The last time that they had won the Cup was in 2004 (3–1 against Olympiacos). The last time that had played in a Final was in 2007, where they had lost to AEL by 1–2.

Aris had reached the Greek Cup Final seven times, winning one of them. The last time that they had won the Cup was in 1970 (1–0 against PAOK). The last time that had played in a Final was in 2008, where they had lost to Olympiacos by 2–0.

Route to the final

Match

Details

See also
2009–10 Greek Football Cup

References

2010
Cup Final
Greek Cup Final 2010
Greek Cup Final 2010
Sports competitions in Athens
April 2010 sports events in Europe